Gu Dar Pyin is a village in northern Rakhine State, Myanmar. On 27 August 2017, the Myanmar Army and local Rakhine collaborators massacred an estimated 400 Rohingya villagers in Gu Dar Pyin, and razed the village. Evidence of the massacre was first reported by the Associated Press on 1 February 2018.

References

Populated places in Rakhine State